Milanko Rašković (Serbian Cyrillic: Миланко Рашковић; born 13 March 1981) is a Serbian professional footballer who plays as a striker for FK Kolubara.

Honours

Club
Red Star Belgrade
 Serbian SuperLiga: 2005–06, 2006–07
 Serbian Cup: 2005–06, 2006–07
Zemun
 Serbian League Belgrade: 2014–15

Individual
 Serbian First League Top Scorer: 2012–13

Notes

References

External links
 
 

Association football forwards
CS Pandurii Târgu Jiu players
Expatriate footballers in Kazakhstan
Expatriate footballers in Malta
Expatriate footballers in Romania
FC Shakhter Karagandy players
First League of Serbia and Montenegro players
FK Bane players
FK Borac Čačak players
FK Čukarički players
FK Kolubara players
FK Zemun players
FK Zeta players
Kazakhstan Premier League players
Liga I players
People from Raška, Serbia
Red Star Belgrade footballers
Serbia and Montenegro under-21 international footballers
Serbian expatriate footballers
Serbian expatriate sportspeople in Kazakhstan
Serbian expatriate sportspeople in Malta
Serbian expatriate sportspeople in Romania
Serbian First League players
Serbian footballers
Serbian SuperLiga players
1981 births
Living people